Ghadamès (Berber:  /  , Standard Arabic  , Libyan Arabic ) is a Berber language that is spoken in, and named after, the oasis town of Ghadames in Nalut District, western Libya.

Research
Ghadamès language materials have been gathered by two linguists. The first materials were published in 1903 and 1904 by  Adolphe de Calassanti Motylinski (1854–1907). A more copious and reliable source is provided by the works of White Father Jacques Lanfry (1910-2000), who stayed in Ghadames from 1944 to 1945 and who published his main works in 1968 and 1973. No new research has been undertaken on location since then. Recently, Kossmann (2013) has published a modern grammar of Ghadamès based on Lanfry’s materials.

Number of speakers
Lanfry mentions the number of c. 4,000 speakers as an optimistic estimate. The actual number of speakers is not known with certainty. Ethnologue cites a number of 13,100 speakers in 2016, including 2,000 living outside the area. However, this number reflects the total number of inhabitants of Ghadames, who are not all native speakers of Ghadamès, while the number of 2,000 emigrant speakers is based on a very old source. Ethnologue classifies the language as 6b (Threatened).

The language
Ghadamès is a Berber language on its own, preserving several unique phonological and morphological features, and the Ghadamès lexicon, as recorded by Lanfry, shows relatively little influence from Arabic. There is as yet no consensus on the classification of Ghadamès within the Berber language group. Aikhenvald and Militarev (1984) group it as Eastern Berber, and Kossmann (1999) specifically groups it together with Awjila. Ethnologue classifies it as East Zenati.

Phonology

Consonants
Like other Berber languages and Arabic, Ghadamès has both pharyngealized ("emphatic") and plain dental consonants. Gemination is contrastive. Consonants listed between brackets occur only very sporadically.

Vowels
Most Berber languages have just three phonemic vowels. Ghadamès, like Tamasheq, has seven vowels.

Basic vocabulary
Below is the Leipzig-Jakarta list for Ghadames, extracted from Lanfry (1973). Lanfry's unconventional transcription has been adapted to modern usage. Symbols  are equivalent to IPA . Lanfry's length notation on vowels probably represents lexical stress (Kossmann 2013: 5, 15).

References

Cited works

Berber languages
Berbers in Libya
Languages of Libya
Language